Veropoulos was a large retail group based in Greece until 2016. It held the SPAR retail franchise for Greece, with the franchise still present in the country after Spar's cooperation agreement with the Asteras Group. As a result of bankruptcy, Veropoulos was bought in 2016 by the Metro Group, which re-branded the stores soon after as My Market stores. In Crete, Veropoulos operated stores under the name of Chalkiadakis. Outside Greece, Veropoulos operated supermarkets in the Republic of North Macedonia as Vero, and in Serbia as SuperVero. The company was established in 1973, when the first Veropoulos supermarket opened in Athens. As of 2012, the company owned 185 stores in Greece, 10 stores in the Republic of North Macedonia and six hypermarkets in Serbia. In Greece, Veropoulos was the fourth-biggest supermarket chain in terms of market share. The firm  belonged to the Veropoulos family who are also the founders of the company.

Stores
These were the stores of Veropoulos as of June 2015:

See also 

List of supermarket chains in Greece

References

External links 
 Veropoulos website (in Greek)

Supermarkets of Greece
Supermarkets of Serbia
Greek brands
Retail companies established in 1973
Companies based in Athens
Greek companies established in 1973